Vladimir Manchev (born 6 October 1977) is a former Bulgarian football player.

Career
He has also played for Bulgarian teams of Spartak Pleven, Yantra and Hebar, French side Lille OSC and Spanish teams Levante UD, Valladolid and Celta Vigo. He was the top goalscorer of the Bulgarian "A" Professional Football Group in 2001–2002 season with 21 goals netted for CSKA Sofia. He won the Bulgarian Cup in 1999 with CSKA. In October 2008 Manchev again became part of the most successful Bulgarian club's squad. In the last match for the autumn period of the 2008–09 season against Lokomotiv Mezdra he received an injury in his knee ligaments, which prevented him from playing football for about 9 months. He was expected to be back in play for the next season. On 30 August 2009, Manchev scored the third goal in the 4:0 home win against Lokomotiv Mezdra in his first game back from injury after coming on as a substitute for Rui Miguel. Manchev is a CSKA Sofia's fans' favourite. Although he was injured most of the season 2008–09, in which he played only 4 matches, he scored 4 goals and made a few assists, so on 16 June 2009 it was said that in the next few days he would sign a new contract, which would make him a CSKA player for the next two years. After all he signed a new one-year contract on 24 July 2009. In the summer 2010 Manchev was transferred to Akademik Sofia, but did not make any appearances in official matches for the team. In February 2012, Manchev signed a contract with Loko Sofia. He scored two goals in his return debut to help his team to a 2:0 win over Loko Plovdiv on 5 March 2012. In March 2015, Manchev was appointed as assistant manager of CSKA Sofia. On 17 September 2016, Manchev became assistant manager of Neftochimic Burgas. In June 2022, he joined the coaching staff of hometown club Hebar.

International career
He was part of the Bulgarian 2004 European Football Championship team, which exited in the first round, finishing bottom of Group C, having finished top of Qualifying Group 8 in the pre-tournament phase.

International goal
Scores and results list Bulgaria's goal tally first.

Honours

CSKA Sofia
 Bulgarian Cup: 1998-99

Managerial statistics

References

External links
 
 
 

1977 births
Living people
Bulgarian footballers
Bulgaria international footballers
Bulgarian expatriate footballers
Expatriate footballers in France
Expatriate footballers in Spain
Bulgarian expatriate sportspeople in France
Bulgarian expatriate sportspeople in Spain
UEFA Euro 2004 players
First Professional Football League (Bulgaria) players
Ligue 1 players
La Liga players
PFC Spartak Pleven players
FC Yantra Gabrovo players
FC Hebar Pazardzhik players
PFC CSKA Sofia players
Lille OSC players
Levante UD footballers
Real Valladolid players
RC Celta de Vigo players
FC Lokomotiv 1929 Sofia players
Association football forwards
Sportspeople from Pazardzhik